Strike Entertainment was an American production company founded in 2002 by Marc Abraham, Thomas Bliss and Eric Newman. Strike's films were distributed through Universal Studios as well as various other majors. Its first film produced was The Rundown starring The Rock. The company was dissolved in March 2013.

Company history
In March 2013, Marc Abraham, Thomas Bliss and Eric Newman dissolved Strike Entertainment after 11 years as a Universal-based production company. The Universal first-look deal dissolved the company in Spring 2013, which marked the end of a 15-year tenure at the studio for Abraham and Newman. Abraham and Newman said the partnership simply ran its course and that the parting is amicable. They will continue to work together on a project they still have percolating under the Strike banner.

List of Strike Entertainment Films
The Rundown (2003)
Bring It On Again (2004)
Dawn of the Dead (2004)
Let's Go to Prison (2006)
Children of Men (2006)
Slither (2006)
The Water Horse: Legend of the Deep (2007)
Flash of Genius (2008)
The Last Exorcism (2010)
The Thing (2011)
In Time (2011)
The Man with the Iron Fists (2012)
The Last Exorcism Part II (2013)
RoboCop (2014)
The Black Lagoon TBA
Magic Kingdom TBA

References

External links
Universal Pictures Official Site

Film production companies of the United States
Universal Pictures
Mass media companies established in 2002
Mass media companies disestablished in 2013
2002 establishments in the United States